is a co-educational private junior college in Aoi-ku, Shizuoka City, Japan.

Founded in 1966 as a junior women's college, it started admitting male students into the art and design program in 1978 and then into the music program in 1996. The college is operated by the foundation that also operates Tokoha Gakuen University.

External links
 Official website 

Educational institutions established in 1966
Private universities and colleges in Japan
Universities and colleges in Shizuoka Prefecture
Buildings and structures in Shizuoka (city)
1966 establishments in Japan
Japanese junior colleges